Ana Nieto (born ) is a Mexican female volleyball player. She is a member of the Mexico women's national volleyball team and played for Jalisco in 2011. 

She was part of the Mexico national team at the 2011 FIVB Volleyball Girls' U18 World Championship, and 2018 FIVB Volleyball Women's World Championship.

Clubs
 Jalisco (2011)

References

External links
FIVB profile

Post-Match - Mexico-Cameroon - FIVB Volleyball Women's World Championship Japan 2018

1994 births
Living people
Mexican women's volleyball players
Place of birth missing (living people)